Cryptic Slaughter is an American crossover thrash band based in Santa Monica, California, and originally formed in 1984.

Biography
Cryptic Slaughter was formed in 1984 by Les Evans (age 17), Scott Peterson (age 14), and Adam Scott (age 15), who met through their mutual participation in the American Youth Soccer League (AYSO). Soon they were joined by Bill Crooks (age 15), a friend of Adam Scott and a fellow soccer player. Adam Scott was let go a few months later due to conflicts regarding his parents and school.

Their first demo, Life in Grave, was produced in 1985 and became well circulated in the burgeoning tape-trader underground. Their first full-length LP, Convicted, was released in 1986 on Death/Metal Blade records, whose artist roster also boasted D.R.I., Corrosion of Conformity, Dr. Know, The Mentors, and Beyond Possession. Within its first year of release, Convicted sold over 25,000 copies and earned Cryptic Slaughter the reputation as being one of the fastest bands in hardcore. Next came Money Talks in 1987, which is still considered by many to be the band's best effort. Mixing crushing grooves with lightning speed, Money Talks surpassed Convicteds success by selling 35,000 in its first year and by earning Cryptic Slaughter a fanatical following around the world. They took on the right-wing theocracy directly, with songs like "Freedom of Expression" that skewered the censorial nature of the Parents Music Resource Center (PMRC), founded by Al Gore's wife Tipper.  Their "American Heroes" directly confronted the mass media heroic mythology of the astronauts who died in the explosion of the space shuttle Challenger, when millions toil to survive daily in a world of injustice.  Along with DRI they were at the forefront of a musical genre known as much for its relentless energy as its radical anti-authoritarian politics, even if not all the listeners paid attention.

The original line-up recorded their final studio album, Stream of Consciousness, in 1988. Unhappy with the recording process and the album's production, the band's internal problems were magnified by life on the road. They broke up in the summer on tour before Stream was released later that fall. They played their last show in Detroit on July 14, 1988.

Shortly after returning home, however, guitarist Les Evans and bassist Rob Nicholson recruited new member Eli Nelson and continued on in a new direction. This new incarnation was short-lived, however, and Evans moved to Portland in May 1989 to reform the band with an entirely new line-up. The final Cryptic Slaughter album, Speak Your Peace (1990), was a definite departure from the previous material, heavily influenced by a changing music scene.

Cryptic Slaughter is often credited as one of the progenitors of crossover, the thrash metal and hardcore crossover genre, along with such seminal acts as D.R.I., Corrosion of Conformity and Suicidal Tendencies.

In 2003, Relapse Records reissued Convicted and Money Talks with added bonus tracks from Cryptic Slaughter's demo and live recordings.

In 2018, due to legal reasons, the band changed its name to Lowlife and continued to tour, until October 2021, when Lowlife reverted its name back to Cryptic Slaughter. They plan to release their first studio album in more than three decades in 2022.

Members

Current members 
Les Evans – guitar (1984–1990, 2002–2003, 2021–present), bass (1988–1999, 2002–2003)
Scott Peterson – drums (1984–1988, 2021–present)
Brad Mowen – vocals (2021–present)
Dave Webb – guitar (2022-present)
Menno Verbaten – bass (2021–present)

Former members 
Dave Hollingsworth – vocals (1989–1990)
Adam Scott – guitar (1984–1985)
Bill Crooks – vocals (1984–1988)
Rob Nicholson – bass (1984–1988)
Bret Davis – bass (1989–1990)
Brian Lehfeldt – drums (1989–1990, 2002–2003)
Chris Merrow – vocals (2002–2003)
Matt Olivo – guitars (2021)
Timeline

Discography

Studio albums
 Convicted (1986)
 Money Talks (1987)
 Stream of Consciousness (1988)
 Speak Your Peace (1990)

EPs 
 Band in S.M. (2003)

Demos 
 Life in Grave (1985)

References

External links
Relapse Records band page

Musical groups established in 1984
Musical groups disestablished in 1990
Musical groups from Los Angeles
Thrash metal musical groups from California
Crossover thrash groups
Musical quartets
Relapse Records artists